Dole is a surname.  Notable people with the surname include:

 Augustus O. Dole (1813–1876), U.S. politician
 Bob Dole (1923–2021), U.S. politician, former U.S. Senator
 Charles Fletcher Dole (1845–1927),  Unitarian minister and author
 Daniel Dole (1808–1878), missionary who founded Punahou School
 Edmund Pearson Dole (1850–1928), lawyer and Hawaii attorney general
 Elizabeth Dole, (born 1936), U.S. politician, former U.S. Senator and former U.S. Cabinet member, wife of "Bob" Dole
 George Dole (1885–1928), American sport wrestler
 James Dole  (1877–1958), Hawaiian Pineapple planter
 Lester Dole (1855–1918), American baseball player
 Nathan Haskell Dole (1852–1935), Boston author
 Mary Phylinda Dole (1862–1947), American woman doctor
 Sanford B. Dole (1844–1926), first Governor of Hawaii
 Vincent Dole (1913–2006), American doctor
 Wigglesworth Dole (1779–1845), Deacon and patriarch of several others